Kang Sun-woo (born 2 June 1978) is a South Korean politician.

She earned her Bachelor's in English education and master's degree in consumer studies and human development from Ewha Womans University. She received her doctorate degree in human development and family studies from University of Wisconsin–Madison where she worked as an instructor from 2010 to 2012. She continued to teach as an assistant professor at South Dakota State University from 2012 to 2016.

In 2016 she joined the Democratic Party and ran for 2016 general election as the number 29 on the list for proportional representation. From 2016 to 2017 she worked as a standing deputy spokesperson of her party. She worked at then-candidate Moon Jae-in's presidential campaign in 2017. She also participated in various policy advisory instruments of Moon government such as National Education Council, National Unification Advisory Council and Presidential Committee for Balanced National Development.

In 2020 she earned the party nomination for Gangseo district for the 21st general election defeating the incumbent parliamentarian Geum Tae-sub by a significant margin. In the election, she defeated the former parliamentarian and diplomat Ku Sang-chan from the main opposition party.

In August 2020, the newly elected leader of her party, Lee Nak-yon, appointed her as one of three standing spokesperson of the party.

Electoral history

References 

1978 births
Living people
People from Daegu
Ewha Womans University alumni
University of Wisconsin–Madison School of Education alumni
South Dakota State University faculty
South Korean women academics
21st-century South Korean women politicians
21st-century South Korean politicians
Members of the National Assembly (South Korea)
Minjoo Party of Korea politicians
Female members of the National Assembly (South Korea)